The 2016 season was FC Seoul's 33rd season in the K League Classic.

Pre-season
 In Guam: From 8 January 2016 to 26 January 2016 
 In Kagoshima, Japan: From 31 January 2016 to 14 February 2016

Pre-season match results

Competitions

Overview

K League Classic

FA Cup

AFC Champions League

Group stage

Knockout stage

Match reports and match highlights
Fixtures and Results at FC Seoul Official Website

Season statistics

K League Classic records

All competitions records

Attendance records

 Season total attendance includes K League Classic, FA Cup, and AFC Champions League combined.

Squad statistics

Goals

Assists

Coaching staff

Choi Yong-soo and Kim Seong-jae caretaker Era (–25 June 2016)

Hwang Sun-hong Era (27 June 2016– )

Supporting staff

Players

Team squad
All players registered for the 2016 season are listed.

Out on loan and military service 

※ In: Transferred from other teams in the middle of the season.
※ Out: Transferred to other teams in the middle of the season.
※ Discharged: Transferred from Sanjgu Sangmu or Ansan Mugunghwa for military service in the middle of the season (registered in 2016 season).
※ Conscripted: Transferred to Sangju Sangmu or Ansan Mugunghwa for military service after the end of the season.

Transfers

In

Rookie Free Agent

 (Univ.) means player who went to university then back to FC Seoul.
 (After Univ.) means player who joined FC Seoul after entering university.

Out

Loan & Military service

Tactics

Tactical analysis 
Former manager Choi Yong-soo used a 3–5–2 formation.
Hwang Sun-hong used a 4–3–3 formation.

Starting eleven and formation 
This section shows the most used players for each position considering a 4–3–3 formation.

Substitutes

References

External links
 FC Seoul official website 
 FC Seoul 2016 Matchday Magazines  
 FC Seoul season review at FC Seoul official blog

FC Seoul seasons
Seoul